Crossocerus is a genus of square-headed wasps in the family Crabronidae. There are at least 250 described species in Crossocerus.

European species
Species within this genus include:

Crossocerus acanthophorus (Kohl 1892)
Crossocerus adhaesus (Kohl 1915)
Crossocerus annulipes (Lepeletier & Brulle 1835)
Crossocerus assimilis (F. Smith 1856)
Crossocerus barbipes (Dahlbom 1845)
Crossocerus binotatus Lepeletier & Brulle 1835
Crossocerus capitosus (Shuckard 1837)
Crossocerus cetratus (Shuckard 1837)
Crossocerus cinxius (Dahlbom 1838)
Crossocerus congener (Dahlbom 1844)
Crossocerus denticoxa (Bischoff 1932)
Crossocerus denticrus Herrich-Schaeffer 1841
Crossocerus dimidiatus (Fabricius 1781)
Crossocerus distinguendus (A. Morawitz 1866)
Crossocerus elongatulus (Vander Linden 1829)
Crossocerus exiguus (Vander Linden 1829)
Crossocerus guichardi Leclercq 1972
Crossocerus heydeni Kohl 1880
Crossocerus italicus Beaumont 1959
Crossocerus leucostoma (Linnaeus 1758)
Crossocerus lindbergi (Beaumont 1954)
Crossocerus lundbladi (Kjellander 1954)
Crossocerus megacephalus (Rossi 1790)
Crossocerus nigrita (Lepeletier & Brulle 1835)
Crossocerus ovalis Lepeletier & Brulle 1835
Crossocerus palmipes (Linnaeus 1767)
Crossocerus podagricus (Vander Linden 1829)
Crossocerus pullulus (A. Morawitz 1866)
Crossocerus quadrimaculatus (Fabricius 1793)
Crossocerus styrius (Kohl 1892)
Crossocerus subulatus (Dahlbom 1845)
Crossocerus tarsatus (Shuckard 1837)
Crossocerus toledensis Leclercq 1971
Crossocerus vagabundus (Panzer 1798)
Crossocerus varus Lepeletier & Brulle 1835
Crossocerus walkeri (Shuckard 1837)
Crossocerus wesmaeli (Vander Linden 1829)

See also
 List of Crossocerus species

References

Crabronidae
Apoidea genera
Hymenoptera of Europe
Taxa named by Amédée Louis Michel le Peletier
Taxa named by Gaspard Auguste Brullé